Dagmar Hagelin (29 September 1959 - disappeared on 27 January 1977) was a 17-year-old Swedish-Argentine girl who disappeared during the Dirty War on 27 January 1977, and is presumed to have been arrested by security forces in El Palomar, Buenos Aires, Argentina, and murdered in a case of mistaken identity. Dagmar's father, Argentine-Swedish businessman Ragnar Hagelin has since worked to have the responsible people brought to justice, accusing Alfredo Astiz.

Hagelin and Svante Grände are the two known Swedish victims of the Dirty War during Argentina's military regime.

In October 2011, Alfredo Astiz was sentenced to life imprisonment for crimes against humanity in Argentina between 1976 and 1983. Dagmar's father, Ragnar Hagelin commented to Swedish media on the sentence that he, "couldn't describe the happiness he felt that after 34 years of struggles, Dagmar’s killer would finally pay for his crimes". In 2010, a pilot named Julio Poch was indicted for the murder of Hagelin. Ragnar Hagelin resided in Stockholm, Sweden, until his death in October 2016.

Mistaken identity
It is believed that Dagmar Hagelin was a victim of mistaken identity when on 27 January 1977, she went to visit a friend in the suburbs of Buenos Aires. Her friend, who was politically active, had been arrested the night before by Alfredo Astiz's forces and had told during interrogations that another politically active friend of her would visit the next day. Hagelin, who had decided to visit her friend on a spur of the moment, was approached by the forces and shot when she tried to escape. She was taken to ESMA, a torture centre, where she was later killed. Hagelin was 17 years old at the time of her death.

See also
List of solved missing person cases
Svante Grände

References

1959 births
1970s missing person cases
1977 deaths
Argentine people of Swedish descent
Female murder victims
Enforced disappearances in Argentina
Incidents of violence against girls
Missing person cases in Argentina
Murdered Swedish children
People from Buenos Aires
People killed in the Dirty War
Women in warfare post-1945
Women in war in South America
Unsolved murders in Argentina